This is the discography for British-American rock musician Lita Ford.

Studio albums

Live albums
 Greatest Hits Live! (2000)
 Kiss Me Deadly – Live (pink vinyl LP) – Cleopatra Records cat # CLP 2036 (2007)
 The Bitch Is Back ... Live (October 22, 2013, in North America)

Compilation albums
 The Best of Lita Ford (1992)
 Greatest Hits (1993)
 Platinum and Gold Collection – The Best of Lita Ford (2004)
 Nobody's Child (2012)
 Time Capsule (2016)

Other appearances
 "Sunset and Babylon", W.A.S.P. single (1993)
 "Herman's Head Season 2 Episode 24 "Love Me Two Timer" May 2, as herself [1993) 
 A Future to This Life: Robocop – The Series Soundtrack; performs title track with Joe Walsh (1995)
 "Whole Lotta Love" and "Rock and Roll" with various artist on A Tribute to Led Zeppelin (1997)
 "I Want to Be Loved" with "LOU" on The Other Side (2005)
 "I'll Be Home for Christmas" with Twisted Sister on A Twisted Christmas (2006)
 "Brütal Legend" Video Game (2009)
 "Big Time Rush" Big Time Moms Mothers Day Special, appearing as herself (2011)
 Guest appearance on Geoff Tate's version of Queensrÿche's Frequency Unknown (2013)
 "American Nights" and "Is It Day or Night" with Cherie Currie on Reverie (March 16, 2015)
 "Wild Thing" (The Troggs cover) on Ace Frehley's cover album, Origins, Vol. 1 (2016)
 "Jumpin' Jack Flash" (The Rolling Stones cover) on Ace Frehley's cover album, Origins, Vol. 2 (2020)

Singles

References 

Discographies of British artists
Rock music discographies
Heavy metal discographies